Tomi Horvat (born 24 March 1999) is a Slovenian footballer who plays for Austrian Bundesliga side Sturm Graz as a midfielder.

Club career
Horvat made his Slovenian PrvaLiga debut for Mura on 21 July 2018 in a game against Triglav Kranj.

References

External links
 
 Tomi Horvat at NZS 

1999 births
Living people
People from Murska Sobota
Slovenian footballers
Slovenia youth international footballers
Slovenia under-21 international footballers
Slovenia international footballers
Association football midfielders
NŠ Mura players
SK Sturm Graz players
Slovenian PrvaLiga players
Austrian Football Bundesliga players
Slovenian expatriate footballers
Slovenian expatriate sportspeople in Austria
Expatriate footballers in Austria